The Flags of the United States of Indonesia refers to the state flags that were used as the official state symbols of the United States of Indonesia (Abbreviation: USI), the predecessor state of the Republic of Indonesia. The flag that were hoisted during the proclamation of independence on 17 August 1945 remained as the official flag of the United States of Indonesia after its transfer of sovereignty on December 27, 1949 and it was written on the Federal Constitution of 1949.

Legal basis

After the Dutch East Indies, on behalf of the Dutch government transferred its sovereignty to the Republic of Indonesia, the new federated state called the United States of Indonesia was formed out of former Dutch territories in the East Indies and several states formed prior to the round table conference held in 1949. The new federation adopted a constitution in which stated in the Chapter III, article III, is that the official flag of the United States of Indonesia is a bicolor red and white, similar to the one that was adopted by the State of the Republic of Indonesia.

State flags

State of the Republic of Indonesia (1949–1950)

State of East Indonesia

During the Denpasar conference held in 1946, a majority of the delegates called for the adoption of the national anthem to be Indonesia Raya, and for the Indonesian red and white flag to be the national flag of East Indonesia. On 22 December, Governor van Mook gave his response to the proposals. He supported the use of the Indonesian national anthem, but was more cautious about the flag.

State of East Sumatra

According to D. Rühl, 1950. The design of the flag was confirmed by a letter from Mr. Van de Velde, Governmental counsellor for Political Affairs on Sumatra to the Lieutenant Governor General Van Mook dd. on 27 Februari 1948, which reads as follows: 

Translated as:

Pasundan

Two flags were used by the State of Pasundan. The first flag consisted of a bicolor flag of green and white and the other was three stripes of green, white, and green.

South Sumatra

The Second Dutch military intervention on 30 August 1948 resulted in the establishment of State of South Sumatra, and was incorporated to USI following the transfer of sovereignty on 27 December 1949. In 1949 the flag was adopted, it was a bicolor yellow and green.

See also
National emblem of Indonesia

References

 
National symbols of Indonesia
Flags of Indonesia